David J. Gunkel (born September 9, 1962) is an American academic and Presidential Teaching Professor of Communication Studies at Northern Illinois University. He teaches courses in web design and programming, information and communication technology (ICT), and cyberculture. His research and publications examine the philosophical assumptions and ethical consequences of ICT.

He has served as the managing editor  of the International Journal of Žižek Studies. Gunkel has published research and provided media commentary on the topics of machine ethics, the digital divide, telematic technologies, new media, Slavoj Žižek Studies, as well as various aspects of internet culture and cyberculture.

His most widely cited material comes from three books, Hacking Cyberspace (2001), which examines the metaphors applied to new technologies, and how those metaphors inform, shape, and drive the implementation of the technology in question; Thinking Otherwise: Philosophy, Communication, Technology (2007), which investigates the unique quandaries, complications, and possibilities introduced by a form of 'otherness' that veils, through technology, the identity of the 'Other'; and The Machine Question: Critical Perspectives on AI, Robots and Ethics (2012)  which examines whether and to what extent intelligent and autonomous machines of our own making can be considered to have legitimate moral responsibilities and any legitimate claim to moral consideration. This book won "best book of the year" from the National Communication Association's (NCA) Communication Ethics Division.

Another piece on print culture and the transition to an electronic medium and culture titled What's the Matter with Books? has been cited in numerous articles on print culture and the digital revolution. And an article on remix titled Rethinking the Digital Remix: Mash-ups and the Metaphysics of Sound Recording  has been subsequently referenced in books and articles on remix culture and mashups.

Gunkel has just completed his fourth book, Heidegger and Media  (Polity, 2014), which he wrote in collaboration with Paul A. Taylor of the University of Leeds (UK).

He has a PhD in philosophy from DePaul University (1996), where he wrote a dissertation on G.W.F. Hegel and an MA from Loyola University, Chicago. His BA was completed at the University of Wisconsin, Madison, where he earned a double major in philosophy and communication. He is married with one son.

Formed a rock group with Abe Glazer named 'Too Much Education', first album with same name released 1988. Recorded and mixed at Saw Mill studios Chicago, IL.

Bibliography

References

External links
Personal and Professional site
" Žižek Studies Home
International Communications Association Newsletter

American male writers
Mass media theorists
Living people
Northern Illinois University faculty
Loyola University Chicago alumni
DePaul University alumni
University of Wisconsin–Madison alumni
1962 births